Vadakkumangudi is a village in Papanasam taluk , Thanjavur District, in India. It is situated in between Thanjavur and Kumbakonam and 5 km from Ayyampet.there is another village in kattumannarkoil thaluk of cuddalore district with the same name

According to the 2011 census it has a population of 2111 living in 455 households. As of 2001 Males constitute 52% of the population and females 48%. Vadakkumangudi has an average literacy rate of 80%, higher than the national average of 59.5%: male literacy is 85%, and female literacy is 75%. In Vadakkumangudi, 12% of the population are under 6 years of age.

It has three Muslim mosques and two Hindu temples.

References

Villages in Thanjavur district